Le Hochet is a village located in the Pamplemousses District of Mauritius. According to the Statistics Mauritius census in 2011, the population was 15,034.

See also 
 Districts of Mauritius
 List of places in Mauritius

References 

Pamplemousses District
Populated places in Mauritius